The House of Representatives is the lower house of the Ohio General Assembly, which is the state legislature of the U.S. state of Ohio. Every two years, all of the house seats come up for election. The 125th General Assembly was in session in 2003 and 2004. The party distribution was 63 Republicans and 36 Democrats.

See also: Ohio House of Representatives

Leadership

Majority Leadership

Minority Leadership

Members of the Ohio House of Representatives, 125th General Assembly

125th General Assembly
House 125
2003 in Ohio
2004 in Ohio